Plectropygus mucoreus is a species of beetle in the family Cerambycidae, and the only species in the genus Plectropygus. It was described by Gahan in 1898.

References

Crossotini
Beetles described in 1898